Jerry W. Sandel (born May 25, 1942) was an American politician who was a Democratic member of the New Mexico House of Representatives from 1971 to 2000. Sandel attended Texas Tech University and is in the oil business, serving as president of the Aztec Well Servicing Company in Aztec, New Mexico.

Electoral history

References

1942 births
Living people
People from Throckmorton County, Texas
People from Farmington, New Mexico
Texas Tech University alumni
Democratic Party members of the New Mexico House of Representatives